Santa María is a city in the province of Catamarca, Argentina.

Climate

References

 

Populated places in Catamarca Province